Stephen L. Danner (born May 3, 1953) is an American politician who served in the Missouri House of Representatives from the 11th district from 1983 to 1987 and in the Missouri Senate from the 28th district from 1991 to 1995.

Background
Danner was born in Macon, Missouri. He received his bachelor's degree from University of Missouri–Kansas City and his J.D. degree from University of Missouri School of Law. Danner was admitted to the Missouri bar and practiced law in Smithville, Missouri. He was involved in construction and motel management. Danner served in the United States Army and the Missouri National Guard. Danner as adjutant general of the Missouri National Guard from 2009 to 2019. His mother Pat Danner also served in the Missouri Senate.

References

1953 births
Living people
People from Macon, Missouri
People from Smithville, Missouri
University of Missouri–Kansas City alumni
University of Missouri School of Law alumni
Missouri National Guard personnel
Missouri lawyers
Democratic Party members of the Missouri House of Representatives
Democratic Party Missouri state senators